The 2015 WAFU Nations Cup was an international association football competition that took place in Saint-Louis, Senegal between 5 and 7 November 2015. The participating nations were Senegal, Guinea Bissau, Gambia, and Liberia.

Senegal sent their under-23 team to prepare for the 2015 Africa U-23 Cup of Nations.

References

International association football competitions hosted by Senegal
Foo